The Edsel Villager is a station wagon that was produced and sold by Edsel from 1958 to 1960.  Like the two-door Roundup and premium Bermuda station wagons, the Villager was initially built on a 116 in wheelbase shared with Ford's station wagons, and, throughout its lifespan, shared Ford's wagons core body stampings. The Villager and the Ranger were the only two model names that existed throughout Edsel's three-year life span as an automobile marque.

The Villager represented the intermediate trim level available within the Edsel brand for station wagons, but differed from the two-door Roundup by being offered in six and nine passenger styles. The Villager was available in a four-door configuration only.

In terms of interior and exterior trim, the Villager had parity with the Edsel Ranger's interior and exterior appointments.  Standard features included black rubber floor mats, ashtrays, cigar lighter, arm rests, chromed rear-view mirror and crank-operated rear windows. Like all other Edsel wagons, the Villager came with a two-piece tailgate. Seat belts were optional.All 1958 station wagons shared the Ranger's engine choices, with a 361 in³ V8 as standard. All wagons came with a three-speed manual transmission.  Buyers also had the option of a three-speed automatic transmission with a standard column-mounted gear selector, or during the 1958 model year, they could choose Edsel's highly touted but trouble-prone Teletouch automatic, which placed its drive-selection buttons in the steering wheel hub.
To differentiate the wagons offered by Edsel from their Ford counterparts, they were fitted with Edsel's front fascia and grille assembly.  The wagons also received unique boomerang-shaped taillights for 1958. The shape of these taillights posed a problem when used as turn indicators – the left-hand taillight appeared as an arrow pointing right and vice versa from a distance.  For 1959, the Villager received round dual taillights set in "beltline" level chrome pods.  In 1960, the Villager used taillights similar to the Ranger of that year.During its first year in production, Edsel sold more Villagers than Roundup and Bermuda station wagons combined.  Despite overall declining Edsel sales in 1959, sales of the 1959 Villager (7,820 units) outpaced the combined three-model ranges of station wagon production in 1958 (6,470 units) by well over 1,000 vehicles.

For 1960, Villager output dropped, directly attributable to Edsel's 43-day production cycle that began in mid-October 1959 and ended in late November 1959.  The lowest production number for any Edsel station wagon during its three years was the 1960 nine-passenger Villager, with just 59 units built.

The Villager name resurfaced at Mercury on a woodgrained Comet station wagon from 1962 to 1967, and subsequently on similarly trimmed wagons in other Mercury series, including the Montego (1970–1976), Bobcat (1974–1980 Canada, 1975–1980 U.S.), Cougar (1977 and 1982), Zephyr (1978–1981) and Lynx (1981–1984). From 1993 to 2002, the name was applied to Mercury's version of the Nissan Quest minivan.

Production numbers

References

 

 Encyclopedia of American Cars by Publications International, Ltd.

External links

 Edsel.com History, specifications, resources for owners.
 Smith Motor Company Virtual Edsel Dealer
 The International Edsel Club
 Edsel.US Restorer's discussion group

Villager
Rear-wheel-drive vehicles
Station wagons
1960s cars
Cars introduced in 1958